Brevoort Lake is a  lake in Mackinac County in the U.S. state of Michigan. Much of the lake's sandy shoreline is owned by the National Forest Service as part of Hiawatha National Forest. In summer months, the National Forest operates Brevoort Lake Campground and the adjacent Brevoort Lake Recreation Area, a beach with boat-launch facilities, on and adjacent to a narrow, sandy peninsula that separates most of the lake from Boedne Bay. A fee is charged for use of the campground.

Game fish species occurring in the lake include walleye, northern pike, smallmouth bass, yellow perch, crappies, muskellunge, and sunfish.

It drains via the Brevoort River into Lake Michigan.

References

Lakes of Michigan